Glenn John McQueen (December 24, 1960 – October 29, 2002) was a Canadian supervisor of digital animation and supervising character animator at Pixar and Pacific Data Images.

Personal life 
McQueen graduated from Sheridan College in 1985. He was sent by Sheridan on a scholarship to the New York Institute of Technology Computer Graphics Lab, where he worked as head of the 3D production department, which made film effects, television commercials, and scientific visuals.

In 1994, he moved to Pixar, partly due to his interest in Toy Story and his respect for John Lasseter, where he supervised the animation on Pixar's early successes, including Toy Story, A Bug's Life, Toy Story 2, and Monsters, Inc.

McQueen also served as a member of the Academy of Motion Picture Arts and Sciences in Hollywood. He and his wife, Terry, had a daughter.

Death 
In December 2001, McQueen was diagnosed with melanoma, but he stated that he would continue working at Pixar. He died on October 29, 2002, at his home in Berkeley, California, at the age of 41, from complications of the disease. His death occurred during the production of Finding Nemo, which is dedicated to him. His former colleagues also paid homage by naming the main character in the film Cars Lightning McQueen.

Legacy 
McQueen has admirers all over the world for his work and has been hailed as one of the best animators in the field. Pixar co-founder John Lasseter called McQueen "a great animator, a great friend and a fantastic family man" and "the heart and soul of our animation department", and also said that "Glenn is not gone from us. He’s still alive in all of us."

Pixar opened a new studio in 2009 in Vancouver, British Columbia, which would be named the Glenn McQueen Pixar Animation Center to honor McQueen. The studio focused on producing short films and television episodes based on Pixar characters. Job qualifications were released in 2009 and the studio opened in spring 2010, producing many shorts including Small Fry (2011) and Partysaurus Rex (2012).

In October 2013, the studio was closed down in order to re-focus Pixar's efforts at its main headquarters.

Filmography

Director 
 1991: The Last Halloween
 1991: "Slide Show"

Animator 
 1992: Sleepwalkers
 1995: Toy Story

Supervising animator 
 1998: A Bug's Life
 1999: Toy Story 2
 2001: Monsters, Inc.

Character animator 
 1994: Angels in the Outfield

References

External links

1960 births
2002 deaths
Canadian animators
Deaths from melanoma
Deaths from cancer in California
Artists from Toronto
Sheridan College alumni
Sheridan College animation program alumni
Pixar people